The Z29 class (formerly J.483 class) was a class of steam locomotives built for the New South Wales Government Railways in Australia for transport and goods transport up the steep gradients of rail track in the Blue Mountains.

Gallery

See also
NSWGR steam locomotive classification

References

29
Scrapped locomotives
Standard gauge locomotives of Australia
2-8-0 locomotives